Jesse Reid is a boxer and Hall of Fame trainer. His former students include world champions Roger Mayweather, Lamon Brewster, Johnny Tapia, Orlando Canizales, Reggie Johnson and Bruce Curry. He has trained 23 World Champions and developed over 40 world-rated boxers.

Fighters trained
Among the boxers and/or boxing world champions who have trained under Jesse Reid at some point in their career are:
Lamon Brewster
Roger Mayweather
Johnny Tapia
Hector Camacho
Tye Fields
Orlando Canizales
Gaby Canizales
Rodolfo Gonzalez
Bruce Curry
Oscar Albarado
Jesse Burnett
Malik Scott
Paul Spadafora
Craig Parker

References

External links 
Interview on The Sweet Science

American boxing trainers
Living people
American male boxers
Year of birth missing (living people)